Dennis Katunarich (born 1950) is a former Australian international lawn bowler.

Bowls career
Katunarich won seven medals at the Asia Pacific Bowls Championships, including three gold medals in the 1987 pairs at Lae in Papua New Guinea and the 1989 pairs and fours in Suva, Fiji.

He lost out on a bronze medal in the fours with Denis Dalton, Ken Woods and Rex Johnston at the 1990 Commonwealth Games in Auckland when being beaten by New Zealand.

He bowls for the Osborne Park Bowling Club.

References

Australian male bowls players
1950 births
Living people
Bowls players at the 1990 Commonwealth Games
Commonwealth Games competitors for Australia
20th-century Australian people
21st-century Australian people